Mágocs is a town in Baranya County, Hungary.

External links

  in Hungarian

Populated places in Baranya County
Hungarian German communities